Nagykanizsa is a district in southern part of Zala County. Nagykanizsa is also the name of the town where the district seat is found. The district is located in the Western Transdanubia Statistical Region.

Geography 
Nagykanizsa District borders with Zalaegerszeg District and Keszthely District to the north, Marcali District (Somogy County) to the east, Csurgó District (Somogy County) to the south, the Croatian county of Koprivnica-Križevci and Lenti District to the west. The number of the inhabited places in Nagykanizsa District is 49.

Municipalities 
The district has 1 urban county, 1 town and 47 villages.
(ordered by population, as of 1 January 2013)

The bolded municipalities are cities.

See also
List of cities and towns in Hungary

References

External links
 Postal codes of the Nagykanizsa District

Districts in Zala County